Qanate Kurdo or Kanat Kalashevich Kurdoev, (1909 –1985), was a Kurdish philologist and professor. He was born in Susuz in Russian Empire and developed Kurdish studies in various fields.

Biography
In 1928, he went to Saint Petersburg to continue his studies, where he attended the Language, history and literature department of University of Leningrad. He received his PhD in 1941. When World War II was reaching its end, Kurdo became part of the "Faculty of Oriental Studies in Leningrad where he taught Kurdish in the Department of Iranian Studies". In 1961, he became the head of the new Kurdology section of the faculty (Kurdskij Kabinet), "which Joseph Orbeli had established in 1959".

References

Sources

Further reading
Note – for best results, download the PDF rather than opening it directly.
Hin lêkolîn û berhemên li ser zimanê Kurdî (List of works on the Kurdish language) (see Kurdoev)

Kurdish-language writers
1909 births
1986 deaths
Academic staff of Saint Petersburg State University
People from Kars Oblast
Russian people of Kurdish descent
Kurdologists
Kurdish scholars
Soviet historians